General William M. Fraser III (born August 17, 1952) is a retired United States Air Force officer who served as Commander, United States Transportation Command. He previously served as Commander, Air Combat Command from September 10, 2009 to September 30, 2011, the 34th Vice Chief of Staff of the Air Force from 9 October 2008 to 27 August 2009, and as Assistant to the Chairman of the Joint Chiefs of Staff from May 2006 to 8 October 2008. As the Assistant to the CJCS, Fraser oversaw matters requiring close personal control by the Chairman, with particular focus on international relations and politico-military concerns. As commander of United States Transportation Command, Fraser was in charge of managing all global air, land and sea transportation. He retired on May 5, 2014.

After retiring from the Air Force, Fraser and Duncan McNabb attempted to cash in on consulting contracts with Azerbaijani cargo carrier Silk Way Airlines in 2014, with both standing to make $5,000 a day. However, their business ventures in Azerbaijan were flagged and ultimately blocked by the United States Department of Defense and State Department, considering their requests to be a threat to national security and a potential embarrassment if the information was ever made public. Documents of the dispute were eventually reported by The Washington Post in 2022.

Military career
Fraser entered the United States Air Force in 1974 as a distinguished graduate of the Texas A&M University Air Force Reserve Officer Training Corps program. His operational assignments include duty as a T-37 Tweet instructor pilot and evaluator; B-52 Stratofortress aircraft commander, instructor and evaluator; and deputy commander of a B-1 Lancer operations group. General Fraser was the first Commander of the 509th Operations Group, then served as the Vice Wing Commander for the 509th Bomb Wing at Whiteman AFB, Mo. He commanded the 28th Bomb Wing at Ellsworth AFB, S.D., and 2nd Bomb Wing at Barksdale AFB, La. His staff duties include tours on the Air Staff, Joint Staff and Joint Strategic Target Planning Staff at Offutt AFB, Neb. He has also served as Chief of the Nuclear Requirements Cell at Supreme Headquarters Allied Powers Europe, and Chief of Staff for United States Strategic Command.

Fraser has extensive wartime, contingency and humanitarian relief operational experience. While serving as the special assistant to the Supreme Allied Commander, Europe, he orchestrated the deployment and operations of JSTARS in support of Operation Joint Endeavor in Bosnia, and also provided direct support to Operation Provide Comfort in Northern Iraq. Additionally, he oversaw the deployment of forces and subsequent withdrawal of 2,444 foreign and United States citizens from Liberia during Operation Assured Response. While commanding the 28th Bomb Wing, he conducted the first-ever deployment of B-1s as part of Operation Desert Thunder in Southwest Asia. He later commanded the 2nd Bomb Wing when they deployed B-52s for combat during Operation Noble Anvil and Operation Allied Force. The wing also deployed 300 personnel throughout Southwest Asia in support of Operation Southern Watch. As Deputy Director for Military Support, he led an intelligence fusion organization providing direct support to Operation Enduring Freedom.

Education
1974 Bachelor of Science degree in engineering technology, Texas A&M University
1977 Squadron Officer School, Maxwell AFB, Ala.
1980 Master of Science degree in management information systems, University of Northern Colorado, Greeley
1983 Marine Corps Command and Staff College, Quantico, Va.
1985 Armed Forces Staff College, Norfolk, Va.
1987 National Security Management Course, Syracuse University, N.Y.
1991 Air War College, Maxwell AFB, Ala.
1995 Executive Development Program, Johnson Graduate School of Management, Cornell University, Ithaca, N.Y.
1999 Combined Force Air Component Commander Course, Maxwell AFB, Ala.
1999 Senior Information Warfare Applications Course, Maxwell AFB, Ala.
2000 National Security Leadership Course, National Security Studies, Maxwell School of Citizenship and Public Affairs, Syracuse University, N.Y.
2002 Executive Program for Russian and U.S. General Officers, John F. Kennedy School of Government, Harvard University, Cambridge, Mass.
2002 Joint Flag Officer Warfighting Course, Maxwell AFB, Ala.
2002 Senior Intelligence Fellows Program
2003 Program for Senior Executives in National and International Security, John F. Kennedy School of Government, Harvard University, Cambridge, Mass.
2005 Leadership at the Peak, Center for Creative Leadership, Colorado Springs, Colo.
2013 Pinnacle, Norfolk, Va.

Assignments
November 1974 – October 1975, student, undergraduate pilot training, Williams AFB, Ariz.
October 1975 – March 1976, student, instructor pilot training, Randolph AFB, Texas
March 1976 – February 1978, T-37 instructor pilot and T-37 check pilot, 96th Flying Training Squadron, Williams AFB, Ariz.
March 1978 – March 1980, T-37 instructor pilot and flight examiner, 82nd Flying Training Wing, Williams AFB, Ariz.
March 1980 – October 1980, Operational Support Aircraft Program Element Monitor, Air Staff Training Program, Headquarters U.S. Air Force, Washington, D.C.
October 1980 – April 1981, Worldwide Military Command, Control and Communications Program Element Monitor, Air Staff Training Program, Headquarters U.S. Air Force, Washington, D.C.
May 1981 – October 1981, B-52H student, 4017th Combat Crew Training Squadron, Castle AFB, Calif.
October 1981 – March 1983, B-52H aircraft commander, later B-52G aircraft commander and instructor pilot, 46th Bomb Squadron, Grand Forks AFB, N.D.
March 1983 – December 1984, Chief, B-52G Standardization and Evaluation Branch, 319th Bomb Wing, Grand Forks AFB, N.D.
January 1985 – June 1985, student, Armed Forces Staff College, Norfolk, Va.
June 1985 – March 1986, Chief, European Single Integrated Operational Plan Tactics, Joint Strategic Target Planning Staff, Offutt AFB, Neb.
April 1986 – October 1987, executive officer to the SAC Chief of Staff, Headquarters SAC, Offutt AFB, Neb.
October 1987 – July 1990, Chief, Nuclear Requirements Cell, SHAPE, Mons, Belgium
July 1990 – July 1991, student, Air War College, Maxwell AFB, Ala.
July 1991 – July 1993, Deputy Commander, 384th Operations Group, McConnell AFB, Kan.
July 1993 – January 1995, Commander, 509th Operations Group, Whiteman AFB, Mo.
January 1995 – August 1995, Vice Commander, 509th Bomb Wing, Whiteman AFB, Mo.
August 1995 – January 1997, special assistant to the Supreme Allied Commander Europe, SHAPE, Mons, Belgium
February 1997 – May 1998, Commander, 28th Bomb Wing, Ellsworth AFB, S.D.
May 1998 – May 1999, Chief of Staff, U.S. Strategic Command, Offutt AFB, Neb.
May 1999 – December 2000, Commander, 2nd Bomb Wing, Barksdale AFB, La.
December 2000 – December 2002, Deputy Director for National Systems Operations, the Joint Staff; Director, Defense Space Reconnaissance Program; and Deputy Director for Military Support, National Reconnaissance Office, Washington, D.C.
January 2003 – October 2004, Director of Operations, Headquarters AETC, Randolph AFB, Texas
November 2004 – February 2005, special assistant to the Commander, Air Force Command and Control, Intelligence, Surveillance and Reconnaissance Center, Deputy Chief of Staff for Warfighting Integration, Langley AFB, Va.
February 2005 – May 2006, Vice Commander, Air Combat Command, Langley AFB, Va.
May 2006 – October 2008, Assistant to the Chairman of the Joint Chiefs of Staff, Washington, D.C.
October 2008 – September 2009, Vice Chief of Staff, Headquarters U.S. Air Force, Washington, D.C.
September 2009 – September 2011, Commander, Air Combat Command, Langley AFB, Va., and Air Component Commander for U.S. Joint Forces Command
October 2011 – May 2014, Commander, U.S. Transportation Command, Scott AFB, Ill.

Flight information
Rating: Command pilot
Flight hours: More than 4,200
Aircraft flown: T-37, T-38, T-1, KC-135R, B-1B, B-2A, B-52G/H and C-21

Awards and decorations

Other achievements
Officer training award, undergraduate pilot training
Top graduate, T-37 pilot instructor training
T-37 Instructor Pilot of the Year
Distinguished graduate, B-52 G/H combat crew training
Air Force Public Affairs Directors Special Achievement Award for commander support
Joseph A. Moller Award, Outstanding Wing Commander, ACC
Honorary Tuskegee Airman
Order of the Sword, Air Combat Command
Air Force 2013 Gray Eagle

Effective dates of promotion

References

External links

Texas A&M University alumni
Living people
Harvard Kennedy School alumni
Samuel Curtis Johnson Graduate School of Management alumni
Syracuse University alumni
University of Northern Colorado alumni
Recipients of the Legion of Merit
United States Air Force generals
1952 births
Recipients of the Defense Superior Service Medal
Vice Chiefs of Staff of the United States Air Force
Recipients of the Defense Distinguished Service Medal
Recipients of the Air Force Distinguished Service Medal